Hypsagonus is a genus of poachers native to the northern Pacific Ocean.

Species
There are currently two recognized species in this genus:
 Hypsagonus corniger Taranetz, 1933
 Hypsagonus quadricornis (Valenciennes, 1829) (Fourhorn poacher)

References

Hypsagoninae